Domingos Ramos Freitas (born 13 July 1997), simply known as Domingos, is a football player who currently plays for the Timor-Leste national football team as a winger.

References

1997 births
Living people
East Timorese footballers
Timor-Leste international footballers
Association football midfielders